George Longbottom is an Australian rugby league player who played professionally for the South Sydney Rabbitohs.

Playing career
Between 1983 and 1985 Longbottom played fourteen matches for the South Sydney Rabbitohs, scoring thirty-three points.

In 1992 he played for the Australian Aboriginies side in the Pacific Cup.

References

Living people
Australian rugby league players
Indigenous Australian rugby league players
Australian Aboriginal rugby league team players
South Sydney Rabbitohs players
Rugby league wingers
Rugby league halfbacks
1961 births
Place of birth missing (living people)